QD Stores is an independently owned discount retailer operating in the United Kingdom, primarily in East Anglia and the East Midlands.

Products stocked include a mixture of items for the home and garden, basic groceries and a range of clothing and footwear.

History
The first QD Stores branch was opened in Norwich in 1985, with the initials QD standing for quality discounts.

During the 1990s QD Stores purchased the small department store Lathams of Potter Heigham, which it still operates under the original name. It also established Cherry Lane Garden Centres which by 2008 had become the eighth biggest UK gardening centre group.

The number of QD Stores locations has grown relatively slowly since 1985. Notable changes to the store estate include the opening of 8 new stores in former Woolworths locations following that company's closure in 2009, as well as the closure of the flagship store in St Stephens Street in Norwich late in 2012.,

In 2010, the company opened its first store outside England in Wrexham, north Wales. Housed in a former Marks & Spencer branch, the store traded for ten years before declining local trade led to closure plans being announced in 2020.

The company added 11 more shops to their portfolio through the purchase of fellow East Anglian discounter Thingmebobs in early 2013. These stores retained their separate identity and a new parent company, QD Commercial Group Holdings, was set up to operate the various related companies.

QD Stores established an e-commerce site selling goods online during 2014 and followed this with the introduction of a 'click and collect' service the following year.

In 2015 QD Stores opened a new garden centre in Countershorpe, Leicester and since then has opened two more garden centre sites in Peterborough and Worcester.

References

Retail companies of the United Kingdom
Variety stores
Discount shops of the United Kingdom
Retail companies established in 1984